Multitronic is a stepless transmission launched by AUDI AG in late 1999, jointly developed and manufactured by LuK.  The capitalization used is multitronic (spelled by Audi with a lower-case leading 'm') and is a registered trademark of AUDI AG.

It is based on the principles of a continuously variable transmission (CVT) popularised by DAF, but differs from other CVTs by using an unconventional type of steel chain consisting of parallel flat chain segments. Unlike the conventional CVT push belt, the Multitronic chain uses tension to transfer forces.

Multitronic is a term originally coined in the original series of Star Trek (see season two, episode 24: The Ultimate Computer). 

It offers a stepless automatic transmission in which the ratio between the input shaft and output shaft can be varied continuously within a given range, providing virtually an infinite number of possible ratios.  The Multitronic system uses a link-plate chain drive, an oil-cooled multi-plate clutch (initially of six parts, later of seven to enable it to cope better with the high torque outputs of larger turbodiesel engines), and complex electronics, to overcome the traditional shortcomings of CVTs, and allow a CVT transmission to be paired with a more powerful engine.

Function
The transmission is monitored and regulated by Audi's "Dynamic Regulating Programme" (DRP), which tracks the driver's inputs (from how the driver applies the throttle pedal), driving conditions, and engine load - to compute the optimal gear ratio for fuel efficiency or maximum performance, as mandated by the user.  The transmission can select pre-programmed underdrive to increase performance, or overdrive to improve economy.  From 2004, Multitronic transmissions offered manual selection of a 'sport mode' to pre-select the performance mapping.  The electronic system also includes sensors to detect whether the vehicle is traveling downhill, and provides additional engine braking in such circumstances.  Multitronic also offers a number of driver-selectable fixed ratios, selectable from either the gear-lever in a sequential style, or via (optional) steering wheel-mounted fingertip paddle-shift controls.

Early versions offered six ratios; in 2004, this was increased to seven, while new Audi models now have Multitronic transmission with eight ratios.  Some Audi A6 variants that feature the Multitronic transmission are now equipped with the fingertip controls on steering wheel as standard.  These controls can also switch to semi-automatic mode when one of the paddles is activated; however, they revert to fully automatic after a predetermined period of time of inactivity.

Real world performance
Multitronic offers performance and economy similar to, and in some cases better than, the equivalent five-speed manual gearboxes, and superior to the traditional automatic transmission.  Particular performance advantages are noticed with 'in-gear' seamless acceleration times over equivalent manual transmission cars.

Multitronic was offered on front wheel drive-only versions of the Audi A4, Audi A5, Audi A6, and the SEAT Exeo with the 2.0 TSI gasoline engine. It is not compatible with the quattro four-wheel drive system, nor transverse engine installations such as in the Audi A3. In 2014 Audi announced to discontinue Multitronic and replace it with S tronic, effectively making the Audi A5 8T the last model it was sold with.

Reliability

There have been numerous reports from owners around the world that the multitronic transmission is prone to electronic glitches and mechanical issues  emerged in the TCUs commonly cause by overheat oil leakage to TCU especially for models (01J & 0AN) using clutch pack with six plates built before or around 2006. Later model ( 0AW with VL381f TCU) have been considered more reliable. Typical symptoms include flashing gear selector (PRNDS indicator) on the dashboard, hesitation and/or shudder during acceleration, inability to select reverse gear and others. Although Audi recommends a transmission fluid change at 55,000 and 115,000 kilometres (or 35,000 and 75,000 miles), there are cases where transmission failures have still occurred even with recommended fluid changes.

In the USA a Class Action was won to give Audi owners a new transmission if it failed in the first 10 years.

Promotional campaign
In 2001, Audi promoted the Multitronic transmission with television commercials throughout Europe, featuring an impersonator of musician and actor Elvis Presley. A prototypical dashboard figure - later named "Wackel-Elvis" ("Wobble Elvis" or "Wobbly Elvis") - appeared in the commercials to demonstrate the smooth ride in an Audi equipped with the Multitronic transmission. The dashboard figure was originally intended for use in the commercials only, but after they aired the demand for Wackel-Elvis grew among fans and the figure was mass-produced in China and marketed by Audi in their factory outlet store.

References

External links

Variable Automatic Gearbox multitronic 01J Design and Function Self-Study Programme 228

Audi
Automatic transmission tradenames
Continuously variable transmissions